Thomas Scott Williams (June 26, 1777 – December 15, 1861) was a U.S. Representative from Connecticut.

He was a descendant of immigrant Robert Williams of Roxbury, a cordwainer of Great Yarmouth and Norwich, England, who arrived in Roxbury, Massachusetts with his wife and several children about 1635.

Born in Wethersfield, Connecticut, Williams completed preparatory studies.
He was graduated from Yale College in 1794.
He studied law.
He was admitted to the bar in 1799 and commenced practice in Mansfield, Connecticut.
He moved to Hartford, Connecticut, in 1803.
He was appointed attorney of the board of managers of the school fund of Hartford 1809–1810.
He served in the State house of representatives in 1813, 1815, and 1816.
He served as clerk of the house in 1815 and 1816.

Williams was elected as a Federalist to the Fifteenth Congress (March 4, 1817 – March 3, 1819).
He was again a member of the State house of representatives in 1819, 1825, and 1827–1829.
He was appointed in 1829 an associate judge of the supreme court of errors and of the superior court, and in May 1834 appointed chief justice, holding the position until his resignation in May 1847.
He served as mayor of Hartford 1831–1835. He served as Vice President of the American Board of Commissioners for Foreign Missions in 1843. 
He resigned from public office.
He served as president of the American Tract Society of New York from May 1848 until his death.
He died in Hartford, Connecticut, December 15, 1861.
Williams married in 1812 Delia Ellsworth, daughter of Founding Father Oliver Ellsworth of Windsor, Connecticut. Williams was interred in Old North Cemetery near his brother-in-law William W. Ellsworth.

References

1777 births
1861 deaths
Yale College alumni
Chief Justices of the Connecticut Supreme Court
Federalist Party members of the United States House of Representatives from Connecticut
Justices of the Connecticut Supreme Court